Malvina Pereira (1883, Florianópolis) was a Brazilian soprano. She is thought to be the first opera singer from Brazil to have had an international career.

Biography
Malvina Pereira was born in Florianópolis in 1883 and probably studied singing in Italy with maestro Bellucci. She must have made her debut in 1901 at the Teatro Odeon in Mendoza and kept appearing in various small opera houses of Latin America till 1910. Her Italian debut happened in 1911 at the Teatro Morlacchi in Perugia, where she performed Violetta in Giuseppe Verdi's La traviata. From that point Pereira's career was almost entirely based in Italy, where she was enormously successful in small provincial theatres but almost never appeared on any important stages. Probably the greatest achievement Pereira made in Italy was in 1917, when she sang in Gaetano Donizetti's Lucia di Lammermoor at the Teatro Carcano in Milan. She is also known to have appeared at the Teatro Bellini di Napoli (as Violetta, Mimì in Giacomo Puccini's La bohème and Elvira in Vincenzo Bellini's I puritani)  and the Teatro Filarmonico in Verona (as Violetta). Apart from Italy, Pereira toured Spain, where in 1914 she sang Rosina in Gioacchino Rossini's Il barbiere di Siviglia, Violetta and Gilda in Verdi's Rigoletto at the Teatro Arriaga in Bilbao, and the United States, where she performed at the Tivoli Theatre in San Francisco as a member of Lambardi Pacific Coast Company. Pereira apparently left the stage in 1920 and subsequently fell into obscurity.

Discography
Pereira must have had a beautifully-timbered coloratura soprano with a perfect technique, as La Prensa wrote about her in 1912: No one can resist the fascination of Mme. Pereira's voice after a few minutes of her singing. What wins the public above all is the sweetness and sympathetic quality of her voice and the perfection of her phrasing. This probably explains the fact that Pereira made quite a few recordings for HMV, Odeon Records and Victor Talking Machine Company, amongst which are several duets from La traviata and Carlos Gomes Il Guarany with the famous tenor Giovanni Zenatello. Moreover, Pereira participated in one of the earliest complete recordings of Gioacchino Rossini's Il barbiere di Siviglia with Ernesto Badini and Edoardo Taliani as partners, made by HMV in 1919 in Milan with the orchestra and chorus of La Scala under the direction of Carlo Sabajno, where she sang the role of Rosina.

References

1883 births
Brazilian sopranos
Year of death unknown